Susan Osborn is a vocalist who came to prominence as the lead singer for the Paul Winter Consort 1978 to 1985.  She can be heard on such albums as "Common Ground", "Missa Gaia" and "Concert For the Earth".  Since leaving the Paul Winter Consort, Osborn has relocated to Orcas Island in the state of Washington. In 1991 Osborn began a long association with Japan, where her voice has been heard on Toyota commercials and film soundtracks.  She was also the subject of an HDTV special on her life for Asahi Television. Osborn has recorded 25 solo CDs, which include traditional Japanese melodies in English, "Wabi" and "The Pearl"; original songs, "ReUnion"; duet recordings of standards with Japanese pianist Kentaro Kihara, "Only One", "Wonderful World" and "Kakehashi"; and a Christmas lullaby, "All Through the Night".  She is currently working on two new projects, one of original songs and one of sacred songs. Her musical collaborators include guitarist Ralf Illenberger, pianist Paul Halley, tenor guitarist Bill Lauf, pianist Wing Wong Tsan, multi-instrumentalist Nancy Rumbel; koto, Curtis Patterson and shakuhachi flute, Bruce Huebner. Osborn has also been teaching about the power of song around the world for over 35 years in innovative classes called "Silence and Song".

External links 
 Susan Osborn Website

New-age musicians
Living people
Year of birth missing (living people)
American jazz singers
Paul Winter Consort members